The Lachine massacre, part of the Beaver Wars, occurred when 1,500 Mohawk warriors launched a surprise attack against the small (375 inhabitants) settlement of Lachine, New France, at the upper end of Montreal Island, on the morning of August 5, 1689.

The attack was precipitated by the growing Iroquois frustration with the increased French incursions into their territory and the ongoing concern about French Marquis de Denonville's attack of 1687, and it was encouraged by the settlers of New England as a way to leverage power against New France during King William's War.

In their attack, the Mohawk warriors destroyed a substantial portion of the Lachine settlement by fire and captured numerous inhabitants, killing around 240.

Motives
The Mohawk and other Iroquois attacked the French and their native allies for a variety of reasons related to both economic and cultural circumstances.

Cultural
The Europeans in the Northeast developed a fur trade with natives, including the Five Nations of the Iroquois, and beaver furs were most desired. In the 17th century, the dominance of what the historian Daniel Richter refers to as "Francophiles," or the French takeover, contributed to an erosion of French-native relations.

The French mission to assimilate natives required the abandonment of native traditions, which was met with resistance. By 1667, large numbers of Hurons and Iroquois, especially Mohawks, started arriving at the St Lawrence Valley and its mission villages to escape the effects of warfare. Many traditionalists, including some Mohawks, resented the Jesuits for destroying traditional native society but could not do anything to stop them. Traditionalists reluctantly accepted the establishment of a mission to have good relations with the French, whom they needed for trade. That cultural invasion increased tensions between the two factions.
The relationship between the French and the Iroquois had been strained long before the Lachine Massacre, as the French maintained relations with other tribes as well for both trade and war alliances, such as the Abenaki.

In 1679, after the end of the Iroquois war with the Susquehannock and the Mahican, the Iroquois raided native villages in the West. Pushing out Siouan tribes to the west, they claimed hunting grounds in the Ohio Valley by the right of conquest. They were kept empty of inhabitants to encourage hunting. As a result, the Iroquois regularly raided trading parties in the western frontier, which was under French protection, and took loot from them.

After a military confrontation in 1684, the Iroquois negotiated a peace treaty with New France Governor Antoine Lefèbvre de La Barre, but it stated the Iroquois were free to attack the western Indians.

The French Crown objected to the treaty and replaced La Barre with the Marquis de Denonville. He was less sympathetic to native relations and did not pay attention to the Iroquois-Algonquian tensions. The Iroquois attacked the French partly because they were not willing to accept constraints against their warfare related to traditional Iroquois enemies.

"Mourning wars" were also an important cultural factor in native warfare. Natives fought war to "avenge perceived wrongs committed by one people against another." They were also a means to replace the dead within a native community. In wartime, natives would capture members of another group and adopt them to rebuild their society. When new diseases such as smallpox killed large numbers of native people within their communities, survivors were motivated to warfare to take captives to rebuild.

Economic
What the Iroquois wanted was not war but a better share of the fur trade. To serve as punishment for attacks on French fur fleets, New France ordered two expeditions under Courcelles and Tracy into Mohawk territory in 1666. The expeditions burned villages and destroyed much of the Mohawk winter corn supply. In addition, Denonville's 1687 invasion of the Seneca nation country destroyed approximately 1,200,000 bushels of corn and crippled the Iroquois economy. That kind of aggression served as fuel for the Iroquois' retaliation that would come.

International
After two decades of uneasy peace, England and France declared war against each other in 1689. Despite the 1686 Treaty of Whitehall in which both European forces agreed that European conflicts would not disrupt colonial peace and neutrality, the war was fought primarily by proxy in New France and New England. The British in New York prompted local Iroquois warriors to attack New France's undefended settlements.

While the British were preparing to engage in acts of warfare, the inhabitants of New France were ill-prepared to defend against Indian attacks because of the isolation of the farms and villages. Denonville was quoted as saying, "If we have a war, nothing can save the country but a miracle of God."

Attack

On the rainy morning of August 5, 1689, Iroquois warriors used surprise to launch their nighttime raid against the undefended settlement of Lachine. They traveled up the Saint Lawrence River by boat, crossed Lake Saint-Louis, and landed on the south shore of the Island of Montreal. While the colonists slept, the invaders surrounded their homes and waited for their leader to signal when the attack should begin. They attacked the homes, broke down doors and windows, and dragged the colonists outside, where many were killed. When some of the colonists barricaded themselves within the village's structures, the attackers set fire to the buildings and waited for the settlers to flee the flames.

According to a 1992 article, the Iroquois, wielding weapons such as the tomahawk, killed 24 French and took more than 70 prisoners. Justin Winsor in Narrative and Critical History of America (1884) stated that "it is estimated that more than two hundred persons were butchered outright, and one hundred and twenty were carried off as prisoners." Other sources, such as Encyclopædia Britannica, claim that 250 settlers and soldiers lost their lives during the massacre. The Iroquois wanted to avenge the 1,200,000 bushels of corn burned by the French, but since they were unable to reach the food stores in Montreal, they kidnapped and killed the Lachine crop producers instead. Lachine was the main departure point for westward-traveling fur traders, a fact that may have provided extra motivation for the Mohawk attack.

Aftermath

In response to the attack, the French mobilized 200 soldiers under the command of Daniel d'Auger de Subercase, along with 100 armed civilians and some soldiers from nearby Forts Rémy, Rolland, and de La Présentation to march against the Iroquois. They defended some of the fleeing colonists from their Mohawk pursuers, but just prior to reaching Lachine, the armed forces were recalled to Fort Rolland by the order of Governor Denonville, who was trying to pacify the local Iroquois inhabitants. He had 700 soldiers at his disposal within the Montreal barracks and might have overtaken the Iroquois forces but decided to follow a diplomatic route.

Numerous attacks from both sides followed, but none was fatal, and the two groups quickly realized the futility of their attempts to drive the other out. In February 1690, the French began peace negotiations with the Iroquois. The French returned captured natives in exchange for the beginnings of peace talks. Throughout the 1690s, there were no major French or native raids, and even against the will of the English, peace talks continued. The time of relative peace eventually led to the Montreal Treaty of 1701 by which the Iroquois promised to remain neutral in case of war between the French and the English.

Following the events at Lachine, Denonville was recalled to France for matters unrelated to the massacre, and Louis de Buade de Frontenac took over governorship of Montreal in October. Frontenac launched raids of vengeance against the English colonists to the south "in Canadien style" by attacking during the winter months of 1690 such as the Schenectady massacre.

Historical accounts
According to the historian Jean-Francois Lozier, the factors influencing the course of war and peace throughout the region of New-France were not exclusive to the relations between the French and Iroquois or to those between the French and British crowns. A number of factors provide the context for the Lachine Massacre.

Sources of information regarding the victims of the Iroquois in New France are the writings of Jesuit priests; the state registry of parishes in Quebec, Trois-Rivieres, and Montreal; letters written by Marie Guyart (French: Marie de l'Incarnation); and the writings of Samuel Champlain. The accuracy of those sources and reports varies. For instance, in the town of Trois-Rivieres, approximately one third of deaths attributed to the Iroquois lack names. According to Canadian historian John A. Dickinson, although the cruelty of the Iroquois was real, their threat was neither as constant nor terrible as the contemporary sources represented although the residents felt under siege.

European accounts of the Lachine massacre come from two primary sources: survivors of the attack, and Catholic missionaries in the area. Initial reports inflated the Lachine death toll significantly. Colby arrived at the total number of dead, 24, by examining Catholic parish registers before and after the attack. French Catholic accounts of the attack were recorded. François Vachon de Belmont, the fifth superior of the Sulpicians of Montreal, wrote in his History of Canada:

Surviving prisoners of the Lachine massacre reported that 48 of their colleagues were tortured, burned, and eaten shortly after capture. Further, many survivors showed evidence of ritual torture and recounted their experiences. After the attack, the French colonists retrieved many English-made weapons, which the Mohawk had left behind in their retreat from the island. The evidence of the English arming the Mohawk incited a longstanding hatred of the English colonists of New York as well as demands for revenge. Iroquois accounts of the attack have not been recovered, as they were recounted in oral histories. French sources reported that only three of the attackers were killed.

Because all of the written accounts of the attack were by the French victims, their reports of cannibalism and parents forced to throw their children onto burning fires may be exaggerated or apocryphal. The Mohawk and the Iroquois have used ritual torture after warfare, sometimes to honour the bravery of enemy warriors, as was then common practice among native tribes.

See also
List of massacres in Canada
History of Montreal
List of Indian massacres

References

Sources
  Also 
  Also  
  Also 
 
 
 
 
 
 
  Also 
 
 
  Also  and 
 

Conflicts in 1689
Battles involving the Iroquois
Massacres in Canada
Massacres by First Nations
1689 in North America
History of Montreal
1689 in New France
Massacres in 1689